Munychryia periclyta is a moth of the Anthelidae family. It was described by Ian Francis Bell Common and Noel McFarland in 1970. It is found in Australia.

References

Moths described in 1970
Anthelidae